Kailasapuram is a township located  from Tiruchirapalli in Tamil Nadu, India. It contains the manufacturing and housing of Bharat Heavy Electricals Limited (BHEL) as part of BHEL's  Tiruchirapalli Complex.

The township is maintained by civil township department of the company that covers nearly 2500 quarters.

Location

Facilities

Housing
It is broadly divided into sectors namely A, B, C, D, E, Nehru Nagar, R, PH and K. The PH, Nehru nagar and K are a little away from Kailasapuram and is called Kamarajapuram. There are major shopping centers in A, C, B and K sectors. The quarters are also divided into Type 2,3,4,5,6 and the Executive Directors Bungalow.

Roads
There are 2 major 4-lane roads in Kailaspuram. The rest of kailasapuram is connected by 2 lane roads.

Shopping 

Shopping centers are available in B,C,E,K and A sectors.

Stadium
Kailasapuram has a huge stadium called the Jawaharlal Nehru Stadium where the 1989 Ranji Trophy matches were held. A vivid sports culture is established through the stadium. Parade function is organised every year on 26 January and 15 August with full enthusiasm. All schools under BHEL trichy unit and security force of BHEL take part in it. The ED of the unit, gives speeches to the audience including company's highlights with present and future plans associated.

Education
The leading schools in the area are:
 RSK Higher Secondary School
 Boiler Plant Boys Higher Secondary School
 Boiler Plant Girls Higher Secondary School
 BHEL Matriculation Higher Secondary School
 Ramakrishna Nursery and Primary School
 St. Joseph's primary school
 Boiler Plant Boys Higher Secondary School

Kailasapuram also houses the Bharathidasan Institute of Management.

Transport

Kailasapuram is easily accessible by road, rail and air situated just  from the centre of Tiruchirapalli City on the Tiruchi-Thanjavur highway and a short distance from the Tiruverumbur railway station, the township is well connected by road and rail. Tiruchirapalli also has an airport catering to both domestic and international flights.

In Popular Culture 
The films Bangaarada Manushya and Bhootayyana Maga Ayyu were filmed in the location

References 

Cities and towns in Tiruchirappalli district
Company towns in India